Eldred Nathaniel Woodcock was a famous hunter and trapper of Potter County, Pennsylvania.  He wrote stories about his life and experiences which were published in the Hunter-Trader-Trapper Magazine between 1903 and 1913.  His stories were compiled into a book titled Fifty Years a Hunter and Trapper, and published by A. R. Harding Publishing Company of St. Louis, Missouri in 1913.

Background 

Eldred Woodcock was born August 30, 1846 in Lymansville, Potter County, Pennsylvania. His grandfather, Isaac Lyman was a Major in the Revolutionary War.

Lymansville was named after my grandparent, Isaac Lyman, or better known as Major Lyman, having held office of that rank in the Revolutionary War.  It is from this limb of the family that I inherited that uncontrollable desire for the trap, gun and the wild. 

Eldred's father owned a grist mill and a saw mill that were about one-half mile apart, and Eldred began trapping at a very early age, along the mill races and ponds. He camped, hunted and trapped in a section of Potter County known as The Black Forest, and killed his first bear at the age of thirteen.

Eldred Nathaniel Woodcock died January 15, 1917, and is buried in the Lymansville Cemetery, Potter County, Pennsylvania.

Books 
Fifty Years a Hunter and Trapper, published by A. R. Harding, 1913

References

External links
 
 

1846 births
1917 deaths
American male writers